BV Orca's, sometimes referred to as Orca's Urk, is a Dutch basketball club based in Urk. The team currently plays in the Eerste divisie, the national third-tier level. The team was founded on 2 August 1963.

From 1983 to 1992, Orca's played in the Eredivisie, the highest level league in the Netherlands.

Honours 
Promotiedivisie

 Champions (3): 1982–83, 1997–98, 2012–13

Notable players 

 Martin de Vries (1983–1984)
 Marcel Huijbens (1989–1992)
 Worthy de Jong (2008–2009)

Head coaches 

 Glenn Pinas (1990–1991)
 Marco van den Berg (1990–1991)

References 

Basketball teams established in 1963
Urk
Basketball teams in the Netherlands